San Antonio de Lomerío is a village located in the Ñuflo de Chávez Province in the Santa Cruz Department of Bolivia.

References

External links 

Populated places in Santa Cruz Department (Bolivia)